

Crown
 Head of State - Queen Elizabeth II

Federal government
Governor General - Michaëlle Jean

Cabinet
Prime Minister - Paul Martin then Stephen Harper
Deputy Prime Minister -  Anne McLellan to none 
Minister of Finance -  Ralph Goodale to Jim Flaherty
Minister of Foreign Affairs - Pierre Pettigrew then Peter MacKay
Minister of National Defence - Bill Graham to Gordon O'Connor
Minister of Health -  Ujjal Dosanjh to Tony Clement
Minister of Industry -  David Emerson to Maxime Bernier
Minister of Heritage -  Liza Frulla to Bev Oda
Minister of Intergovernmental Affairs - Lucienne Robillard then Michael Chong
Minister of the Environment - Stéphane Dion to Rona Ambrose
Minister of Justice -  Irwin Cotler to Vic Toews
Minister of Transport -  Jean Lapierre to Lawrence Cannon
Minister of Citizenship and Immigration - Joe Volpe to Monte Solberg
Minister of Fisheries and Oceans - Geoff Regan to Loyola Hearn
Minister of Agriculture and Agri-Food - Andy Mitchell to Chuck Strahl
Minister of Public Works and Government Services - Scott Brison to Michael Fortier
Minister of Natural Resources - John Efford to Gary Lunn
Minister of Human Resources and Skills Development - Belinda Stronach to Diane Finley

Members of Parliament
See: 38th Canadian parliament, 39th Canadian parliament

Party leaders
Liberal Party of Canada - Paul Martin to Bill Graham (interim) to Stéphane Dion
Conservative Party of Canada - Stephen Harper
Bloc Québécois - Gilles Duceppe
New Democratic Party - Jack Layton
Green Party of Canada - Jim Harris to Elizabeth May

Supreme Court justices
Chief Justice: Beverley McLachlin
Marshall Rothstein
Michel Bastarache
William Ian Corneil Binnie
Louis LeBel
Marie Deschamps
Morris Fish
Louise Charron
Rosalie Abella

Other
Speaker of the House of Commons - Peter Milliken
Governor of the Bank of Canada - David Dodge
Chief of the Defence Staff - General Rick Hillier

Provinces & Territories

Lieutenant-governors
Lieutenant-Governor of Alberta - Normie Kwong
Lieutenant-Governor of British Columbia - Iona Campagnolo
Lieutenant-Governor of Manitoba - John Harvard
Lieutenant-Governor of New Brunswick - Herménégilde Chiasson
Lieutenant-Governor of Newfoundland and Labrador - Edward Roberts
Lieutenant-Governor of Nova Scotia - Myra Freeman
Lieutenant-Governor of Ontario - James Bartleman
Lieutenant-Governor of Prince Edward Island - Léonce Bernard
Lieutenant-Governor of Quebec - Lise Thibault
Lieutenant-Governor of Saskatchewan - Lynda Haverstock

Premiers
Premier of Alberta - Ed Stelmach
Premier of British Columbia - Gordon Campbell
Premier of Manitoba - Gary Doer
Premier of New Brunswick - Bernard Lord to Shawn Graham
Premier of Newfoundland and Labrador - Danny Williams
Premier of Nova Scotia - John Hamm to Rodney MacDonald
Premier of Ontario - Dalton McGuinty
Premier of Prince Edward Island - Pat Binns
Premier of Quebec - Jean Charest
Premier of Saskatchewan - Lorne Calvert
Premier of the Northwest Territories - Joe Handley
Premier of Nunavut - Paul Okalik
Premier of Yukon - Dennis Fentie

Mayors
see also list of mayors in Canada
Toronto - David Miller
Montreal - Gérald Tremblay
Vancouver - Larry Campbell
Ottawa - Bob Chiarelli
Winnipeg - Sam Katz
Edmonton - Stephen Mandel
Calgary - Dave Bronconnier
Victoria - Alan Lowe

Religious leaders
Roman Catholic Archbishop of Quebec and Primate of Canada - Cardinal Archbishop Marc Ouellet
Roman Catholic Archbishop of Montreal -  Cardinal Archbishop Jean-Claude Turcotte
Roman Catholic Bishops of London - Bishop Ronald Peter Fabbro
Roman Catholic Archbishop of Toronto -  Cardinal Archbishop Aloysius Ambrozic then Archbishop Thomas Christopher Collins
Primate of the Anglican Church of Canada -  Andrew Hutchison
Moderator of the United Church of Canada - Peter Short then David Giuliano
Moderator of the Presbyterian Church in Canada -  Richard Fee then Wilma Welsh
National Bishop of the Evangelical Lutheran Church in Canada -  Raymond Schultz

Peer
Michael Grant, 12th Baron de Longueuil

See also
2005 Canadian incumbents
Events in Canada in 2006
2007 Canadian incumbents
 incumbents around the world in 2006
 Canadian incumbents by year

2006
Incumbents
Incumbents
Canadian incumbents
Canadian leaders